Ron Stewart (1932–2012) was a Canadian professional ice hockey player.

Ron Stewart may also refer to:
 Ron Stewart (Canadian football) (born 1934), former Canadian football player
 Ronald Stewart (1927–2022), Member of Canadian Parliament
 Ron Stewart (politician) (born 1942), member of Nova Scotia government
 Ron Stewart (bluegrass) (born 1968), American multi-instrumentalist musician
 Ron Stewart (rugby union) (1904–1982), New Zealand rugby union player